Wulsin may refer to:

Given name
 Wulsin (Abbot Ulsinus), ninth- or tenth-century abbot of St Alban's Abbey, England
 Wulsin of Sherborne (died 973), monk, abbot, then Bishop of Sherborne

Surname
Janet Elliott Wulsin (1894–1963), American explorer
Lawson Wulsin (born 1951), psychiatrist and author
Lucien Wulsin III (1916–2009), American businessman and president of Baldwin Piano
Seth Wulsin, American sculptor and musician
Victoria Wells Wulsin, American epidemiologist and politician